Sannesund Bridge is a motorway cantilever bridge that crosses Glomma river in Viken county, Norway. It extends from Alvim in Sarpsborg  to Årum in Fredrikstad.The bridge is 1528 metres long, the longest span is 139 metres, and the maximum clearance is 30 metres. The bridge has 48 spans.

Sandesund Bridge was opened in 1978. It carries traffic on European route E6. Under the bridge is a narrow pedestrian bridge over Glomma. Sannesund Bridge is actually two bridges travelling in opposite directions.  In 2005, a duplicate of the old bridge began construction. The new bridge parallel to the old one was opened in May 2008. The old bridge was subsequently closed for renovation. It opened again in November 2008, creating a four-lane motorway.

See also
List of bridges in Norway
List of bridges in Norway by length
List of bridges by length

References

Bridges completed in 1978
Bridges completed in 2008
Buildings and structures in Sarpsborg
Road bridges in Viken
European route E6 in Norway